Peretz Kidron (29 July 1933 – 6 November 2011) was an Israeli writer, journalist and translator.

Biography
He was born in Vienna, the son of Sara and Herman Kirchenbaum [Kay] who were devoted Zionists and supporters of the Jewish state. His family escaped to Great Britain in 1938 following the annexation of Austria into Nazi Germany. After completing his secondary education in Britain he emigrated to Israel, where he lived on and off in Kibbutz Zikim for about 15 years. Both of his children were born in the kibbutz. During this period he was sent by the kibbutz to the UK as a youth leader for the Zionist leftist youth movement Hashomer Hatzair, to prepare and bring Jewish youth to migrate to Israel. In the early 1970s, he graduated from Tel-Aviv University in English and translation.

From the late 1960s, he became active in the Israeli peace movement. In 1975, he was a founding member of the Israeli Council for Israeli-Palestinian Peace and served on the steering committee of the human rights group B'Tselem. Kidron was a long time Israel correspondent for Christopher Mayhew’s Middle East International.

From The 1980s, Kidron handled international contacts for the peace group Yesh Gvul. He compiled and edited a collection of writings of those who refuse to serve in the Israeli army, Refusenik! Israel's Soldiers of Conscience.

In 1976, he co-authored the memoirs of the Palestinian activist Raymonda Tawil, My Home, My Prison. His translations from Hebrew to English include the memoirs of Yitzak Rabin and Ezer Weizman, and a biography of David Ben-Gurion. His translation of Rabin's autobiography was censored by Israel's military censor. The passages removed were Rabin's account of the 1948 departure of 50,000 civilians from Ramla and Lydda, particularly Ben-Gurion's gesture, which Rabin understood to mean "Drive them out!" The missing passages were printed in The New York Times on 23 October 1977.

Death
Peretz Kidron died in Jerusalem, Israel, on 6 November 2011, and was buried at Kibbutz Kiryat Anavim.

References

1933 births
2011 deaths
Israeli translators
Israeli journalists
Austrian emigrants to Israel
20th-century translators
B'Tselem people
Writers from Vienna